Durandal or Durendal is the legendary sword of the French hero Roland.

Durandal may also refer to:

Military:
Durandal-class destroyer, a group of four destroyers built for the French Navy between 1896 and 1900, used during the First World War
French destroyer Durandal, the name ship of her class
Matra Durandal, an anti-runway penetration bomb
SNCASE SE.212 Durandal, a French prototype fighter aircraft

Arts and entertainment:
Durendal (journal), a Belgian literary and cultural review (1894-1921)
Durandal (novel), a novel by Harold Lamb
Marathon 2: Durandal, 1995 video game
Gilbert Durandal, a character in Mobile Suit Gundam SEED Destiny

People:
Segundo Durandal (1912–1976), Bolivian football defender

Places:
Durandal is the name of a rock off the coast of Île Amsterdam in the Indian Ocean.

See also
 Dirndl, a traditional Bavarian dress